Silver Spring is a census-designated place (CDP) in southeastern Montgomery County, Maryland, United States, near Washington, D.C. Although officially unincorporated, in practice it is an edge city, with a population of 81,015 at the 2020 census, making it the fifth-most populous place in Maryland after Baltimore, Columbia, Germantown, and Waldorf.

Downtown, next to the northern tip of Washington, D.C., is the oldest and most urbanized part of the community, surrounded by several inner suburban residential neighborhoods inside the Capital Beltway. Many mixed-use developments combining retail, residential, and office space have been built since 2004. 

Silver Spring takes its name from a mica-flecked spring discovered there in 1840 by Francis Preston Blair, who subsequently bought much of the surrounding land. Acorn Park, south of downtown, is believed to be the site of the original spring.

Geography

As an unincorporated CDP, Silver Spring's boundaries are not consistently defined. This definition is a 15% reduction from the  used in previous years.

The official Silver Spring CDP contains the following neighborhoods: Downtown Silver Spring, East Silver Spring, Woodside, Woodside Park, Lyttonsville, North Hills Sligo Park, Long Branch, Indian Spring, Goodacre Knolls, Franklin Knolls, Montgomery Knolls, Clifton Park Village, New Hampshire Estates, and Oakview.

Other organizations, such as the U.S. Geological Survey, U.S. Postal Service, Silver Spring Urban Planning District, and Greater Silver Spring Chamber of Commerce, each use their own slightly different definitions. The Postal Service in particular assigns Silver Spring mailing addresses to a large swath of eastern Montgomery County sometimes called "Greater Silver Spring," including Four Corners, Woodmoor, Wheaton, Glenmont, Forest Glen, Forest Glen Park, Aspen Hill, Hillandale, White Oak, Colesville, Colesville Park, Cloverly, Calverton, Briggs Chaney, Greencastle, Northwood Park, Ashton, Sandy Spring, Sunset Terrace, Fairland, Lyttonsville, Kemp Mill, a portion of Langley Park, and a portion of Adelphi. The area that has a Silver Spring mailing address is larger in area than any city in Maryland except Baltimore.

Landmarks in the downtown area include the AFI Silver Theatre, the National Museum of Health and Medicine, a branch of The Fillmore, and the headquarters of the National Oceanic and Atmospheric Administration. Greater Silver Spring includes the headquarters of the Seventh-day Adventist Church, the Food and Drug Administration, and the Ahmadiyya Muslim Community in the U.S.

Parks and recreation

Four major creeks run through Silver Spring: from west to east, they are Rock Creek, Sligo Creek, Long Branch, and Northwest Branch. Each is surrounded by parks offering hiking trails, playgrounds, picnic areas, and tennis courts. On weekends, roads are closed in the parks for bicycling and walking.

Northwest Branch Park also includes the Rachel Carson Greenway Trail, named after Rachel Carson, the author of Silent Spring and a former resident of the area. It continues north to Wheaton Regional Park, in Greater Silver Spring, which is home to the  Brookside Gardens.

The  Jessup Blair Park, south of downtown, has a soccer field, tennis courts, basketball courts, and a picnic area. There are similar local parks throughout the residential parts of the community.

Demographics

2020

As of the 2020 census, an estimated 81,015 people lived in Silver Spring. There were 32,114 households; their average annual income was $83,782. 

50.9% of the population was female.

33.3% of the population was White (Non-Hispanic), 28% was Black or African American alone (Non-Hispanic), 19.4% of the population was Other (Hispanic), 7.12% of the population was Asian (Non-Hispanic), 6.68% of the population was White (Hispanic), 3.16% was Multiracial (Non-Hispanic), 1.08% was Multiracial (Hispanic), 0.47% was Black or African American (Hispanic), 0.29% was Asian (Hispanic), and 0.19% was American Indian & Alaska Native (Hispanic).

28% of the population identified as Hispanic. 

As of 2019, 36.5% of Silver Spring residents (29,800 people) were born outside of the United States, which is higher than the national average of 13.9%. Of these, the most predominant foreign-born people are from El Salvador, Ethiopia, India, and China.

2010
Note: For the 2010 census, the boundaries of the Silver Spring CDP were changed, reducing the land area by approx. 15%. As a result, the population count for 2010 shows a 6.6% decrease, while the population density increased 11%.

As enumerated in the 2010 census, there were 71,452 residents, 28,603 total households, and 15,684 families residing in the Silver Spring CDP. The racial makeup of the community, as defined by the U.S. Census Bureau, for residents who self-identified as being members of "one race" was 45.7% White (7.8% German, 7.0% Irish, 5.7% English), 27.8% Black or African American (5.2% Ethiopian, 1.1% Haitian), 0.6% American Indian and Alaska Native, 7.9% Asian (2.35% Indian, 1.74% Vietnamese, 1.32% Chinese, 0.63% Korean), 0.1% Native Hawaiian and Other Pacific Islander, and 13.2% "Some Other Race" (SOR). 4.8% of the CDP's residents self-identified as being members of two or more races. Hispanic or Latino residents "of any race" comprised 26.3% of the population (12.3% Salvadoran, 3.71% Guatemalan, 2.83% Mexican). Like much of the Washington metropolitan area, Silver Spring is home to many people of Ethiopian ancestry.

There were 28,603 households, out of which 27.1% had children under the age of 18 living with them, 37.6% were married couples living together, 11.9% had a female householder with no husband present, and 45.2% were non-families. 33.6% of all households were made up of individuals living alone, and 16.5% had someone living alone who was 65 years of age or older. The average household size was 2.49 and the average family size was 3.21.

In the census area, the population was spread out, with 21.4% under the age of 18, 9.4% from 18 to 24, 37.1% from 25 to 44, 23.8% from 45 to 64, and 8.4% who were 65 years of age or older. The median age was 33.8 years. For every 100 females, there were 94.9 males, and for every 100 females age 18 and over, there were 92.2 males.

Males had a median income of  versus  for females. Twenty-one percent (±9.1%) of those under the age of 18 and 23.6% (±10.6%) of those 65 and older were living below the poverty line.

2000
For the 2000 census, there were 76,540 people, 30,374 households, and 17,616 families residing in the census area (if all areas with the "Silver Spring" address are included, the population swells to around 250,000). The racial makeup of the community was 46.61% White, 28.07% Black American, 0.44% Native American, 8.22% Asian, 0.06% Pacific Islander, 11.55% from other races, and 5.04% from two or more races. Hispanic or Latino people of any race consist of 22.22% of the population.

There were 30,374 households, out of which 29.4% had children under the age of 18 living with them, 40.8% were married couples living together, 12.5% had a female householder with no husband present, and 42.0% were non-families. Thirty-two-point six percent (32.6%) of all households were made up of individuals, and 7.8% had someone living alone who was 65 years of age or older. The average household size was 2.50 and the average family size was 3.21.

The ages of the population were varied, with 23.0% under the age of 18, 9.3% from 18 to 24, 37.0% from 25 to 44, 21.2% from 45 to 64, and 9.6% who were 65 years of age or older. The median age was 34 years. For every 100 females, there were 93.4 males. For every 100 females age 18 and over, there were 89.5 males.

The median income for a household in the census area was $51,653, and the median income for a family was $60,631. Males had a median income of $38,124 versus $36,096 for females. The per capita income for the area was $26,357. 9.3% of the population and 6.4% of families were below the poverty line. 11.7% of those under the age of 18 and 9.7% of those 65 and older were living below the poverty line.

History
The area that is now Silver Spring has been inhabited by various indigenous peoples for 10,000 years. Prior to European colonization, the area was inhabited by the Piscataway, an Algonquian-speaking people. The Piscataway may have established a few small villages along the banks of Sligo Creek and Rock Creek.

19th century
The Blair, Lee, and Jalloh and Barrie families, three politically active families of the time, are tied to Silver Spring's history. In 1840, Francis Preston Blair, who later helped organize the modern American Republican Party, along with his daughter, Elizabeth, discovered a spring flowing with chips of mica – believed to be the now-dry spring visible at Acorn Park. Blair was looking for a site for his summer home to escape the heat of Washington, D.C., summers. Two years later, Blair completed a 20-room mansion he dubbed "Silver Spring" on a  country homestead. In 1854, Blair moved to the mansion permanently. The house stood until 1954.

By 1854, Blair's son, Montgomery Blair, who became Postmaster General under Abraham Lincoln and represented Dred Scott before the United States Supreme Court, built the Falkland house in the area.

By the end of the decade, Elizabeth Blair married Samuel Phillips Lee, third cousin of future Confederate leader Robert E. Lee, and gave birth to a boy, Francis Preston Blair Lee. The child would eventually become the first popularly elected Senator in United States history.

During the American Civil War, Abraham Lincoln visited the Silver Spring mansion multiple times. During some of the visits, he relaxed by playing town ball with Francis P. Blair's grandchildren.

In 1864, Confederate Army General Jubal Early occupied Silver Spring before the Battle of Fort Stevens. After the engagement, fleeing Confederate soldiers razed Montgomery Blair's Falkland residence.

At the time, there was a community called Sligo located at the intersection of the Washington-Brookeville Turnpike and the Washington-Colesville-Ashton Turnpike (now named Georgia Avenue and Colesville Road). Sligo included a tollhouse, a store, a post office, and a few homes. The communities of Woodside, Forest Glen, and Linden were founded after the Civil War. These small towns largely lost their separate identities when a post office was established in Silver Spring in 1899.

By the end of the 19th century, the region began to develop into a town of size and importance. The Baltimore & Ohio Railroad's Metropolitan Branch opened on April 30, 1873, and ran from Washington, D.C., to Point of Rocks, Maryland, through Silver Spring.

The first suburban development appeared in 1887 when Selina Wilson divided part of her farm on current-day Colesville Road (U.S. Route 29) and Brookeville Road into five- and ten-acre (20,000- and 40,000 m2) plots. In 1892, Francis Preston Blair Lee and his wife, Anne Brooke Lee, gave birth to E. Brooke Lee, who is known as the father of modern Silver Spring for his visionary attitude toward developing the region.

20th century

The early 20th century set the pace for downtown Silver Spring's growth. E. Brooke Lee and his brother, Blair Lee I, founded the Lee Development Company, whose Colesville Road office building remains a downtown fixture. Dale Drive, a winding roadway, was built to provide vehicular access to much of the family's substantial real estate holdings. Suburban development continued in 1922 when Woodside Development Corporation created Woodside Park, a neighborhood of  plot home sites built on the former Noyes estate in 1923. In 1924, Washington trolley service on Georgia Avenue (present-day Maryland Route 97) across B&O's Metropolitan Branch was temporarily suspended so that an underpass could be built. The underpass was completed two years later, but trolley service never resumed. It would be rebuilt again in 1948 with additional lanes for automobile traffic, opening the areas to the north for readily accessible suburban development.

Takoma-Silver Spring High School, built in 1924, was the first high school for Silver Spring. The community's rapid growth led to the need for a larger school. In 1935, when a new high school was built at Wayne Avenue and Sligo Creek Parkway, it was renamed Montgomery Blair High School. (The school remained at that location for over six decades, until 1998, when it was moved to a new, larger facility at the corner of Colesville Road (U.S. Route 29) and University Boulevard (Maryland Route 193). The former high school building became a combined middle school and elementary school, housing Silver Spring International Middle School and Sligo Creek Elementary School.) The Silver Spring Shopping Center (built by developer Albert Small) and the Silver Theatre (designed by noted theater architect John Eberson) were completed in 1938, at the request of developer William Alexander Julian. The Silver Spring Shopping Center was unique because it was one of the nation's first retail spaces that featured a street-front parking lot. Conventional wisdom held that merchandise should be in windows closest to the street so that people could see it; the shopping center broke those rules (the shopping center was purchased by real estate developer Sam Eig in 1944 who was instrumental in attracting large retailers to the city).

Before the 1950s, Silver Spring was known as a sundown town due to influential land owners. The North Washington Real Estate Company designed 63 acres to be white-only, written in its deeds to prevent the sale of land to anyone else. No legislative action was taken to prevent this until 1967 (where such an ordinance was illegal until Shelley v. Kramer, 1948).

By the 1950s, Silver Spring was the second-busiest retail market between Baltimore and Richmond; major retailers included the Hecht Company, J.C. Penney, and Sears, Roebuck and Company. In 1954, after standing for over a century, the Blair mansion "Silver Spring" was razed and replaced with the Blair Station Post office. 1960 saw the opening of Wheaton Plaza (later known as Westfield Wheaton), a shopping center several miles north of downtown Silver Spring. It captured much of the town's business, and the downtown area began a long period of decline.

On December 19, 1961, a  segment of the Capital Beltway (I-495) was opened to traffic between Georgia Avenue (MD 97) and University Boulevard East (MD 193). On August 17, 1964, the final segment of the  Beltway was opened to traffic, and a ribbon-cutting ceremony was held near the New Hampshire Avenue interchange, with a speech by Gov. J. Millard Tawes, who called it a "road of opportunity" for Maryland and the nation.

Washington Metro rail service into Washington, D.C., helped breathe life into the region starting with the 1978 opening of the Silver Spring station. The Metro Red Line followed the right-of-way of the B&O Metropolitan Branch, with the Metro tracks centered between the B&O's eastbound and westbound mains. The Red Line heads south to downtown DC from Silver Spring, running at grade before descending into Union Station.  By the mid-1990s, the Red Line continued north from the downtown Silver Spring core, entering a tunnel just past the Silver Spring station and running underground to three more stations: Forest Glen, Wheaton and Glenmont.

Nevertheless, the downtown decline continued in the 1980s. The Hecht Company closed its downtown location in 1987 and moved to Wheaton Plaza while forbidding another department store from renting its old spot. City Place, a multi-level mall, was established in the old Hecht Company building in 1992, but it had difficulty attracting quality anchor stores and gained a reputation as a budget mall, anchored by Burlington Coat Factory and Marshalls, as well as now-closed anchors AMC Theatres, Gold's Gym, Steve and Barry's, and Nordstrom Rack. JC Penney closed its downtown store—downtown's last remaining department store—in 1989, opening several years later at Wheaton Plaza. In the late 1980s and early 1990s, developers considered a shopping mall and office project called Silver Triangle, with possible anchor stores Nordstrom, Macy's, and JC Penney, but no final agreement was reached. Shortly thereafter, in the mid-1990s, developers considered building a mega-mall and entertainment complex called the American Dream (similar to the Mall of America) in downtown Silver Spring, but the revitalization plan fell through before any construction began because the developers were unable to secure funding. However, one bright spot for downtown was that the National Oceanographic and Atmospheric Administration (NOAA) consolidated its headquarters in four new high-rise office buildings near the Silver Spring Metro station in the late 1980s and early 1990s.

A 1996 train collision on the Silver Spring section of the Metropolitan line left 11 people dead. On February 16 of that year, during the Friday-evening rush hour, a MARC commuter train bound for Washington Union Station collided with the Amtrak Capitol Limited train and erupted in flames on a snow-swept stretch of track in Silver Spring.

The Maryland State Highway Administration started studies of improvements to the Capital Beltway in 1993, and have continued, off and on, examining a number of alternatives (including HOV lanes and high-occupancy toll lanes) since then.

21st century

At the beginning of the 21st century, downtown Silver Spring began to see the results of redevelopment. Several city blocks near City Place Mall were completely reconstructed to accommodate a new outdoor shopping plaza called "Downtown Silver Spring." New shops included national retail chains such as Whole Foods Market, a 20-screen Regal Theatres, Men's Wearhouse, Ann Taylor Loft, DSW Shoe Warehouse, Office Depot, and the now-closed Pier 1 Imports, as well as many restaurants, including Panera Bread, Red Lobster, Cold Stone Creamery, Fuddruckers, Potbelly Sandwich Works, Nando's Peri-Peri, and Chick-fil-A. A Borders book store was a popular spot until it closed when the chain went out of business; it was replaced by H&M. In addition to these chains, Downtown Silver Spring is home to a wide variety of family-owned restaurants representing its vast ethnic diversity. As downtown Silver Spring revived, its 160-year history was celebrated in a PBS documentary entitled Silver Spring: Story of an American Suburb, released in 2002. In 2003, Discovery Communications completed the construction of its headquarters and relocated to downtown Silver Spring from nearby Bethesda. However, Discovery, Inc. announced in 2017 that they would be relocating to New York City. The reason for this move, according to Discovery, was to operate close to their "ad partners on Madison Avenue," "investors and analysts on Wall Street," and their "creative and production community," said their CEO, David Zaslav, in an email to employees. 2003 also brought the reopening of the Silver Theatre, as AFI Silver, under the auspices of the American Film Institute. Development continues with the opening of new office buildings, condos, stores, and restaurants. In 2015–16, the long-struggling City Place Mall underwent a complete renovation, had its name changed to Ellsworth Place, and brought in new tenants, including TJ Maxx, Ross Dress for Less (a re-opening original tenant), Michaels, Forever 21, and Dave & Buster's. The restoration of the old B&O Passenger Station was undertaken between 2000 and 2002, as recorded in the documentary film Next Stop: Silver Spring. In 2005, Downtown Silver Spring was awarded the silver medal of the Rudy Bruner Award for Urban Excellence

Beginning in 2004, the downtown redevelopment was marketed locally with the "silver sprung" advertising campaign, which declared on buses and in print ads that Silver Spring had "sprung" and was ready for business. In June 2007, The New York Times noted that downtown was "enjoying a renaissance, a result of public involvement and private investment that is turning it into an arts and entertainment center".

In 2007, the downtown Silver Spring area gained attention when an amateur photographer was prohibited from taking photographs in what appeared to be a public street. The land, leased to the Peterson Cos., a developer, for $1, was technically private property. The citizens argued that the Downtown Silver Spring development, partially built with public money, was still public property. After a protest on July 4, 2007, Peterson relented and allowed photography on their property under limited conditions. Peterson also claimed that it could revoke these rights at any time. The company further stated that other activities permitted in public spaces, such as organizing protests or distributing campaign literature, were still prohibited. In response, Montgomery County Attorney Leon Rodriguez said that the street in question, Ellsworth Drive, "constitutes a public forum" and that the First Amendment's protection of free speech applies there. In an eight-page letter, Rodriguez wrote, "Although the courts have not definitively resolved the issue of whether the taking, as opposed to the display, of photographs is a protected expressive act, we think it is likely that a court would consider the taking of the photograph to be part of the continuum of action that leads to the display of the photograph and thus also protected by the First Amendment." The incident was part of a trend in the United States regarding the blurring of public and private spaces in developments built with both public and private funds.

In 2008, construction of the long-planned Intercounty Connector (ICC), which crosses the upper reaches of Silver Spring, got under way. The highway's first section opened on February 21, 2011; the entire route was completed by 2012.

In July 2010, the Silver Spring Civic Building and Veterans Plaza opened in downtown Silver Spring.

In May 2019, The Peterson Companies, owners of the Downtown Silver Spring development, announced a $10 Million renovation of the area that will include public art and a new outdoor plaza, featuring green space.

Culture

Downtown Silver Spring hosts several entertainment, musical, and ethnic festivals, the most notable of which are the Silverdocs documentary film festival held each June and hosted by Discovery Communications and the American Film Institute, as well as the annual Thanksgiving Day Parade (Saturday before Thanksgiving) for Montgomery County. The Silver Spring Jazz Festival has become the biggest event of the year drawing 20,000 people to the free festival held on the second Saturday in September.  Featuring local jazz artists and a battle of high school bands, the Silver Spring Jazz Festival has featured such jazz greats as Wynton Marsalis, Arturo Sandoval, Sérgio Mendes, Aaron Neville and such bands as the Mingus Big Band and the Fred Wesley Group.

The Fillmore is a live entertainment and music venue with a capacity of 2,000 people. It opened in 2011 in the former JC Penney building on Colesville Road. The venue joins the American Film Institute and Discovery Communications as cornerstones of the downtown Silver Spring's arts and entertainment district. It has featured performances by artists Prince Royce, Minus the Bear, Tyga, Wale (rapper), Schoolboy Q, Migos, and many other hip hop acts. In August 2012 R&B singer Reesa Renee launched her album Reelease at the Fillmore.

Downtown Silver Spring is also home to the Cultural Arts Center, Montgomery College. The Cultural Arts Center offers a varied set of cultural performances, lectures, films, and conferences. It is a resource for improving cultural literacy, encouraging cross-cultural understanding, and to build bridges between the arts, cultural studies, and all disciplines concerned with the expression of culture.

Dining in Silver Spring is also extremely varied, including American, African, Burmese, Ethiopian, Guatemalan, Japanese, Moroccan, Italian, Mexican, Salvadoran, Jamaican, Vietnamese, Lebanese, Thai, Persian, Chinese, Indian, Greek, and fusion restaurants, as well as many national and regional chains.

Silver Spring has many churches, synagogues, temples, and other religious institutions, including the World Headquarters of the Seventh-day Adventist Church. Silver Spring serves as the primary urban area in Montgomery County and its revitalization has ushered in an eclectic mix of people and ideas, evident in the fact that the flagship high school (Montgomery Blair High School) has no majority group with each major racial and ethnic group claiming a significant percentage.

Silver Spring hosts the American Film Institute Silver Theatre and Culture Center, on Colesville Road. The theatre showcases American and foreign films. Gandhi Brigade, a youth development media project, began in Silver Spring out of the Long Branch neighborhood. Docs in Progress, a non-profit media arts center devoted to the promotion of documentary filmmaking is located at the "Documentary House" in downtown Silver Spring. Downtown Silver Spring is also home to the National Oceanic and Atmospheric Administration (NOAA), an agency of the United States Department of Commerce that includes the National Weather Service; the American Nurses Association; and numerous real estate development, biotechnology, and media and communications companies.

Stevie Nicks, of the band Fleetwood Mac has credited Silver Spring, Maryland as the inspiration for the title of the band's 1977 song "Silver Springs". In a 1998 interview, Nicks said "I wrote Silver Springs uh, about Lindsey [Buckingham]. And I ~ we were in Maryland somewhere driving under a freeway sign that said Silver Spring, Maryland. And I loved the name. ...Silver Springs sounded like a pretty fabulous place to me. And uh, 'You could be my silver springs...' that's just a whole symbolic thing of what you could have been to me."

Transportation

The major roads in Silver Spring are mostly three- to five-lane highways. The Capital Beltway can be accessed from Georgia Avenue (MD 97), Colesville Road (US 29), and New Hampshire Avenue (MD 650).

The long-planned Intercounty Connector (ICC) (MD-200) toll road opened in three segments between February 2011 and November 2014. ICC interchanges in the Silver Spring area include Georgia Avenue, Layhill Road (MD-182), New Hampshire Avenue, Columbia Pike (US-29) and Briggs Chaney Road.

Silver Spring is serviced by the Brunswick Line of the MARC Train, Metrorail Red Line, Metrobus, Ride On, and the free VanGo. The bus terminal at the Silver Spring Rail Station is the busiest in the entire Washington Metro Area, and provides connections between several transit services, including those mentioned above. This transit facility serves nearly 60,000 passengers daily.

Construction commenced in October 2008 on the new $91 million Paul S. Sarbanes Transit Center, which will further expand the station to facilitate the growing demand for public transportation, due to the increase in population in the Silver Spring area. The new center is a multilevel, multimodal facility which incorporates Metrobus, Ride On, Metrorail, MARC train, intercity Greyhound bus, and local taxi services under one roof. The project was completed over four years behind schedule and $50 million over budget. The center opened on September 20, 2015.

The Purple Line light rail, under construction by the Maryland Transit Administration (MTA) is planned to service this station, connecting Silver Spring with Bethesda to the west and then running east to the University of Maryland-College Park and then southeast to the New Carrollton Metro station. The Purple Line is scheduled to open in 2026.

In addition to the Silver Spring station, the Washington Metrorail's Forest Glen station is also located in Silver Spring and the MARC train also stops at the nearby Kensington station.

Education

Montgomery County Public Schools 
Silver Spring is served by a county-wide public school system, Montgomery County Public Schools.

High schools 
 Montgomery Blair High School 
 Albert Einstein High School 
 Wheaton High School 
 Northwood High School
 John F. Kennedy High School 
 Springbrook High School

Middle schools 
 Benjamin Banneker Middle School
 Silver Spring International Middle School
 Takoma Park Middle School
 Eastern Middle School
 White Oak Middle School
 Briggs Chaney Middle School
 Argyle Middle School
 Odessa Shannon Middle School (previously Col. E. Brooke Lee Middle School)
 Sligo Middle School
 Francis Scott Key Middle School
 A. Mario Loiderman Middle School
 Thornton Friends Middle School
 Silver Creek Middle School

Of the public high schools in the region, prior to 2010, Montgomery Blair High School was the only one within the census-designated place of Silver Spring. It is nationally recognized for its Communication Arts Program and its Science, Mathematics, and Computer Science Magnet Program, the latter of which perennially produces a large number of finalists and semi-finalists in such academic competitions as the Intel Science Talent Search.

Private schools
Notable private schools in the region include The Siena School, the Yeshiva of Greater Washington, the Torah School of Greater Washington, and The Barrie School.

Saint Francis International School St. Camillus Campus, K–8, is in Silver Spring. It was formerly St. Camillus School, which was operated by sisters of Notre Dame de Namur and opened in 1954. In the middle of the 1960s it had up to 1,200 students. Working-class people were the main clientele. The student population was decreasing by the 1980s as working-class people moved from the area. By the same decade the teachers were mostly lay staff. In the decade of the 2000s the school's financial situation deteriorated. In 2010 the school had 260 students. It merged into Saint Francis International, which opened in 2010; at that time all teachers had to reapply for their jobs. In 2010 Saint Francis International had 435 students at all campuses. In 2014 it had 485 students at all campuses; over 70% the students were of parents born abroad.

Montgomery College 
A portion of the Montgomery College Takoma Park/Silver Spring campus is located within the Silver Spring boundary, with the rest of the campus located in Takoma Park. The community college is Montgomery County's main institute of higher education – the main campus is in the county seat of Rockville. Adjacent to the White Oak neighborhood in the outer reaches of Silver Spring is the campus of the National Labor College.

Howard University 
Howard University's School of Continuing Education is located in Silver Spring, with its main campus in nearby Washington, D.C..

Libraries
Silver Spring is served by many public libraries:

 Brigadier General Charles E. McGee Library located in downtown Silver Spring.
 Connie Morrella (formerly Bethesda)
 Wheaton 
 Marilyn J. Praisner (formerly Fairland) 
 White Oak and Long Branch.

Silver Spring Library started operation in 1931 and is one of the most heavily used in the Montgomery County System. It was relocated in June 2015 to Wayne Avenue and Fenton Street as part of the Downtown Silver Spring redevelopment plan.

Economy
A number of major companies and organizations are based in Silver Spring, including:

United Therapeutics (biotechnology company)
Food and Drug Administration (federal agency)
National Oceanic and Atmospheric Administration (federal agency)
Urban One (media company)
American Nurses Association (professional organization)
CuriosityStream (streaming media company)
Global Communities (international development and humanitarian aid nonprofit)

Sports
The Silver Spring Saints Youth Football Organization has been a mainstay of youth sports in the town since 1951. Located in Silver Spring, Maryland, the Silver Spring Saints play home games at St. Bernadette's Church near Blair High School. The club was formed when two local Catholic parishes, St. John the Baptist and St. Andrews, merged their football programs to compete in the Capital Beltway League after the CYO (Catholic Youth Organization) for the Archdiocese of Washington D.C. discontinued its youth football program at the end of the 1994 season. The name "Saints" is derived from the merging of the two Catholic parishes. In 2009, the Saints moved from the Capital Beltway League (CBL) to the Mid-Maryland Youth Football & Cheer League (MMYFCL).

Silver Spring is also home to several swim teams, including Parkland, Robin Hood, Calverton, Franklin Knolls, Daleview, Oakview, Forest Knolls, Kemp Mill, Long Branch, Stonegate, Glenwood, Rock Creek, and Northwest Branch, Hillandale, and West Hillandale.

Silver Spring and Takoma Park together host Silver Spring-Takoma Thunderbolts a college wooden-bat baseball team playing in the Cal Ripken, Sr. Collegiate Baseball League. Home games are played at Montgomery Blair Stadium.

The Potomac Athletic Club Rugby team has a youth rugby organization based in Silver Spring. Established in 2005, PAC Youth Rugby has tag rugby for ages 5 to 15, girls and boys and also offer introduction to tackle rugby for U13 and U15 players. In addition to introducing numerous young athletes to the sport of rugby, PAC has also won Maryland state championships across the age groups.

Media
Silver Spring is served by Washington, D.C. outlets such as the Washington Post and the Washington Times. Several online outlets also cover local Silver Spring news, including Source of the Spring, The Voice, and Silver Spring Patch. Eye On Sligo Creek covers nature and news along Sligo Creek. Silver Spring was served by The Gazette until it closed in June 2015 and by the Montgomery County Sentinel until it ceased publication in January 2020.

The Washington Hispanic has its offices in Silver Spring.

Several notable broadcasting companies currently have headquarters in Silver Spring, including Urban One. After relocating to New York City in 2018, Discovery Inc. sold its former Silver Spring headquarters to Foulger-Pratt and Cerberus Capital Management, and leased a smaller space at nearby 8403 Colesville Road.

Notable people
Joe Alexander, (b. 1986), American-Israeli basketball player in the Israel Basketball Premier League
 Brady Anderson, (b. 1964), baseball player
 Akil Baddoo, (b. 1998), baseball player for the Detroit Tigers
 Jonathan Banks, (b. 1947), actor
 Alex Bazzie, (b. 1990), football player
 Carl Bernstein, (b. 1944), journalist, writer
 Keter Betts, (1928–2005), musician
 Lewis Black, (b. 1948), comedian
 Brandon Broady, (b. 1986), comedian, television host
 Bill Callahan, (b. 1966), musician
 Rachel Carson, (1907–1964), author of Silent Spring
 Crystal Chappell, (b. 1965), actress
 Dave Chappelle, (b. 1973), comedian
 Connie Chung, (b. 1946), news presenter 
 Gaelan Connel, (b. 1989), actor, musician 
 Chuck Davidson, (b. 1961), rabbi
 Tommy Davidson, (b. 1963), comedian, actor
 Marc Davis, (b. 1990), NASCAR driver 
 Dominique Dawes, (b. 1976), gymnast, 4-time Olympic medalist
 Cara DeLizia, (b. 1984), actress
 Matt Drudge, (b. 1966), internet news editor
 Michael Ealy, (b. 1973), actor
 Wayne Federman, (b. 1959), comedian, actor, writer
 Charles Fefferman, (b. 1949), mathematician
David Feldberg, (b. 1977), professional disc golfer
 Martin Felsen, (b. 1968), architect
 Steve Francis, former basketball player
 Jason Freeny, (b. 1970), sculptor, toy designer
 Kimmy Gatewood, actress, writer and singer
Emily Gould, (b. 1981), author
Jerian Grant, (b. 1992), basketball player for the Washington Wizards
Josh Hart, (b. 1995) basketball player for the New Orleans pelicans; first-round selection in 2017 NBA draft
Goldie Hawn, (b. 1945), actress, dancer, producer, and singer
 Keith Howland, (b. 1964), musician (Chicago)
 Frank Jackson (b. 1998), NBA player
 Amir Mohamed el Khalifa, better known by his stage name Oddisee, is an American rapper
 Humayun Khan, (1976 – 2004) U.S. Army Officer of Pakistani descent and a Muslim, posthumous recipient of the Purple Heart and the Bronze Star Medal.
 Rick Leventhal, (b. 1960), journalist
 Elliot Levine, (b. 1963), musician (Heatwave)
 Dov Lipman, (b. 1971), member of the Knesset.
 Matt Maloney, (b. 1971), former basketball player
 Michelle M. Marciniak, (b. 1973), former WNBA professional basketball player and collegiate coach
Roger Mason Jr., (b. 1980), former basketball player
 Joey Mbu, (b. 1993), football player
Victor Oladipo, (b. 1992), basketball player for the Houston Rockets
 George Pelecanos, (b. 1957), author 
 Al Quie, (b. 1923), former Governor of Minnesota (1979–1983)
 Gretchen Quie, (1927–2015), artist and former First Lady of Minnesota (1979–1983)
 J. Robbins, (b. 1967), musician (Jawbox, Office of Future Plans)
 Nora Roberts, (b. 1950), novelist
 Daniel Snyder, (b. 1964), businessperson and owner of the Washington Commanders
 Harold Solomon (b. 1952), tennis player ranked No. 5 in the world
 Norman Solomon, (b. 1951), journalist, political candidate
 Ben Stein, (b. 1944), commentator, humorist, actor
 Rebecca Sugar, (b. ca. 1987), artist, composer, and director
 Daryush Valizadeh, (b. 1979), neomasculinity writer
 Thalia Zedek, (b. 1961), musician (Live Skull, Come)

See also
 Washington metropolitan area
 Montgomery County, Maryland
 Silver Spring Library
 Montgomery County Public Libraries
 Montgomery County Public Schools
 Montgomery College
 Silver Spring Monkeys

References

Further reading
 McCoy, J, et al. (2003). Silver Spring Timeline. Retrieved August 6, 2003 from "Silver Spring history".
 McCoy, Jerry A. and Silver Spring Historical Society. Historic Silver Spring. Charleston, SC: Arcadia Publishing, 2005.

External links

  The Silver Spring Regional Center
 Silver Spring Downtown District

Documentary films 
 Silver Spring:  Story of an American Suburb
 Next Stop: Silver Spring
 Silver Spring Stories

 
1887 establishments in Maryland
Census-designated places in Maryland
Census-designated places in Montgomery County, Maryland
Unincorporated communities in Montgomery County, Maryland
Unincorporated communities in Maryland
Edge cities in the Baltimore-Washington metropolitan area
Sundown towns in Maryland